F. B. Hawley offered his risk theory of profit in 1893. According to Hawley, risk in business arose from product obsolescence, a sudden fall in prices, superior substitutes, natural calamities, or scarcity of certain crucial materials.

Background
Risk taking was an inevitable component of dynamic production, and those who took risk in business had a right to a separate reward known as "profit". According to Hawley, profit is the price  by society for assuming business risk. A businessman would not take a risk without expecting compensation in excess of actuarial value- i.e., a premium on calculable risk. The reason that expected profit must be more than actuarial risk is the assumption that risk gives rise to dis-utilities of various kinds. Therefore, assuming risk gives the entrepreneur a claim to a reward in excess of the actuarial value of the risk.

Hawley stated that profit was composed of two parts: one part represents compensation for average loss incidental to the various causes of risk, and the other part represents an inducement to suffer the consequences of being exposed to the risk. Hawley believed that profits arose from the factor of ownership, as long as the ownership included risks. If the entrepreneur avoided [risk] by insuring against it, he ceased to be an entrepreneur and should not receive profits. According to Hawley, profit arose out of uninsured risk. The uncertainty ends with sale of the entrepreneur's product. Profit thus is a residue. Hawley's theory is also known as the "residual theory of profit"

References

External links

Risk analysis
Business economics